Raipur Legislative Assembly constituency is one of the seventy electoral Uttarakhand Legislative Assembly constituencies of Uttarakhand state in India. It includes Raipur area.

Raipur Legislative Assembly constituency is a part of Tehri Garhwal Lok Sabha constituency.

Election results

2022

See also
 Raipur, Uttarakhand

References

External links
  

Politics of Dehradun
Assembly constituencies of Uttarakhand
2002 establishments in Uttarakhand
Constituencies established in 2002